Agent architecture in computer science is a blueprint for software agents and intelligent control systems, depicting the arrangement of components. The architectures implemented by intelligent agents are referred to as cognitive architectures. The term agent is a conceptual idea, but not defined precisely. It consists of facts, set of goals and sometimes a plan library.

Types

Reactive architectures 
 Subsumption

Deliberative reasoning architectures 
 Procedural reasoning system (PRS)

Layered/hybrid architectures 
 3T
 AuRA
 Brahms
 GAIuS
 GRL
 ICARUS
 InteRRaP
 TinyCog
 TouringMachines

Cognitive architectures 
 ASMO
 Soar
 ACT-R
 Brahms
 LIDA
 PreAct
 Cougaar
 PRODIGY
 FORR

See also
 Action selection
 Cognitive architecture
 Real-time Control System

References

Software architecture
Robot architectures